Carl Langhans may refer to:

 Carl Gotthard Langhans (1732–1808), Prussian master builder and royal architect
 Carl Ferdinand Langhans (1782–1869), his son, Prussian architect